The ATP-binding cassette 4 gene encodes the Multidrug resistance protein 3. ABCB4 is associated with progressive familial intrahepatic cholestasis type 3 and intrahepatic cholestasis of pregnancy.

The membrane-associated protein encoded by this gene is a member of the superfamily of ATP-binding cassette (ABC) transporters.  ABC proteins transport various molecules across extra- and intra-cellular membranes.  ABC genes are divided into seven distinct subfamilies (ABC1, MDR/TAP, MRP, ALD, OABP, GCN20, White).  This protein is a member of the MDR/TAP subfamily.  Members of the MDR/TAP subfamily are involved in multidrug resistance as well as antigen presentation.  This gene encodes a full transporter and member of the p-glycoprotein family of membrane proteins with phosphatidylcholine as its substrate (flippase activity).  The function of this protein has not yet been determined; however, it may involve transport of phospholipids from liver hepatocytes into bile.  Alternative splicing of this gene results in several products of undetermined function.

Cancer 
ABCB4 gene has been observed progressively downregulated in Human papillomavirus-positive neoplastic keratinocytes derived from uterine cervical  preneoplastic lesions at different levels of malignancy.  For this reason, ABCB4 is likely to be associated with tumorigenesis and may be a potential prognostic marker for uterine cervical  preneoplastic lesions progression.

Other conditions that have been associated with mutations in this gene include low phospholipid associated cholelithiasis syndrome, high gamma glutamyl transferase intrahepatic cholestasis of pregnancy, chronic cholangiopathy and adult biliary fibrosis.

References

Further reading

External links